The Tsitsikamma River is a small river at the western end of the Eastern Cape coast, South Africa. It is part of the Fish to Tsitsikama Water Management Area.

Course
It is a small permanent river that has its sources in the Tsitsikamma Mountains. Initially it flows southwards, then it flows southeastwards, parallel to the coast for most of its course, bending southwestwards only 3 km from its mouth in Huisklip Beach.

See also
Tsitsikamma National Park
 List of rivers of South Africa
 List of reservoirs and dams in South Africa

References

External links
 Tsitsikamma National Park
Tsitsikamma River Research

Rivers of the Eastern Cape